O'Brien station is a Via Rail flag stop station located in O'Brien, Ontario on the Sudbury – White River train.

External links
Via Rail station page

Via Rail stations in Ontario
Railway stations in Algoma District